Dangerous Curves is a 1962 Soviet film. It is a remake of the 1959 film Naughty Curves (also known as Mischievous Curves). The plot revolves around two rival motorcyclists' love for one of the two twin sisters.

The film was shot in Estonia in 1960–61, and released internationally in 1962. It was filmed in the Soviet-designed Kinopanorama format.

In 1999, Fifth Continent Australia Pty Ltd and Vision 146 SARL commissioned the restoration of two reels from the eleven-reel film. These have since been screened at the former New Neon Movies in Dayton, Ohio, the Cinerama Dome in Hollywood, California, and most recently at the Bradford Widescreen Festival on 19 March 2008.

Although plans to restore the remaining reels were abandoned in 2001 due to the project's estimated high cost, the complete three-planel camera negatives and sound elements were restored by Nikolay Mayorov to digital 2K for the Russian State Film Archive Gosfilmofond in 2010. This restoration was screened in Tallinn on 14 November 2015 at the CC Plaza Scape screen and later on ETV, the Estonian national television channel, featuring interviews with the principal actors.

Cast
Terje Luik	as Marika / Ellen
Rein Aren as Raul
Peeter Kard as Peeter 
Eve Kivi as Evi
Harijs Liepiņš	as Ants
Rudolf Nuude as Trainer
Jaanus Orgulas as Peeter

References

External links
 

1962 films
1960s Russian-language films
1960s sports comedy films
Soviet sports comedy films
1962 comedy films
Estonian comedy films
Soviet-era Estonian films